George I. Wilber House is a historic home located at Oneonta in Otsego County, New York. It was built in two phases, 1875 and about 1890.  It is a three-story wood-frame structure on a stone foundation in the Queen Anne style.  It features a three-story, round corner tower, cross gabled roof, and a large, very decorative wrap-around porch with a porte-cochere.  In 1997 it became home to the Upper Catskill Community Council of the Arts.

It was listed on the National Register of Historic Places in 2000.

References

External links
 Upper Catskill Community Council of the Arts website

Houses on the National Register of Historic Places in New York (state)
Houses completed in 1875
Houses in Otsego County, New York
National Register of Historic Places in Otsego County, New York